Marjina Abdulla is a 1973 Indian Bengali-language film based on Ali Baba and the Forty Thieves directed by Dinen Gupta. This film has been music directed by Salil Choudhury.The film starring Gita Dey, Utpal Dutt, Santosh Dutta, Mithu Mukherjee Rabi Ghosh and Debraj Roy in the lead roles.

Cast
 Mithu Mukherjee as Marjina
 Debraj Roy as Hossain
 Santosh Dutta as Alibaba
 Rabi Ghosh as Abdullah
 Utpal Dutt Chieftain of 39 thieves
 Shekhar Chatterjee as Qasim
 Menaka Devi
 Gita Dey as Fatima
 Kajal Gupta as Sakina
 Preeti Majumdar
 Shambhu Bhattacharya
 Jahor Roy as Baba Mustafa

References

External links
 

Bengali-language Indian films
1973 films
1970s Bengali-language films
Films based on Ali Baba
Films based on One Thousand and One Nights